Puerto Cortés is a district of the Osa canton, in the Puntarenas province of Costa Rica it is known as the melancholyc and historical town of Costa Rica.

History 
Puerto Cortés was created on 29 July 1940 by Ley 185.

Geography 
Puerto Cortés has an area of  km² and an elevation of  metres.

Demographics 

For the 2011 census, Puerto Cortés had a population of  inhabitants.

Transportation

Road transportation 
The district is covered by the following road routes:
 National Route 34
 National Route 168

References 

Districts of Puntarenas Province
Populated places in Puntarenas Province